Joe Dietl is an American actor, writer, director and producer.

Dietl is gay and he lives in Palm Springs with Ben Zook, his creative partner in the comedy web series Where the Bears Are.

Filmography

Actor

Director
All of this project involved the actor Michael Irpino at the direction, except for Sorry and Where the Bears Are.

Writer

Producer

References

External links

American film directors
American male screenwriters
American male film actors
American male television actors
American male web series actors
21st-century American male actors
LGBT film directors
American LGBT screenwriters
American gay writers
American gay actors
Living people
Year of birth missing (living people)